Robert Randall Peterson (born September 26, 1951 in Fargo, North Dakota) is a North Dakota public servant and politician with the Republican Party who served as North Dakota State Auditor from 1997 to 2016. He was also a Presidential Elector for the state in 1996. His father, Robert W. Peterson, was his predecessor as State Auditor; he served from 1973 to 1996.

Biography
Bob Peterson is a graduate of Williston High School. He received his Associate in Arts degree from UND-Williston and his Bachelor of Science degree from the University of North Dakota. He also took classes in accounting at the University of Mary. He served as the accounting and budget specialist for the North Dakota State Land Department from 1978 to 1996 when he was elected as North Dakota State Auditor. He lives in Bismarck and is married to Kathleen and has one daughter, Brynn.

In 2015, Peterson announced that he would not seek a sixth term in the 2016 election.

Electoral history

Notes

External links
 Office of Robert R. Peterson, North Dakota State Auditor

1951 births
Living people
North Dakota Republicans
North Dakota State Auditors
People from Williston, North Dakota
1996 United States presidential electors